Diploknema is a genus of plant in the Sapotaceae described as a genus in 1884.

Diploknema is native to Southeast Asia, the Himalayas, and southwestern China.

Species
 Diploknema butyracea  - Uttarakhand, Nepal, Sikkim, Bhutan, Assam, Tibet, Andaman Islands
 Diploknema butyraceoides  - Uttarakhand, Nepal, Sikkim, Bhutan, Assam, Myanmar
 Diploknema oligomera  - Maluku
 Diploknema ramiflora  - Luzon
 Diploknema sebifera  - Peninsular Malaysia, Borneo
 Diploknema siamensis  - southern Thailand
 Diploknema yunnanensis  - Yunnan

References

 
Sapotaceae genera